Francisco Couana (born 10 November 1996) is a Mozambican cricketer who plays for the Mozambique national cricket team. In November 2019, he was named in Mozambique's Twenty20 International (T20I) squad for the 2019 T20 Kwacha Cup. These were the first T20I matches to be played by Mozambique since the International Cricket Council (ICC) granted T20I status to all matches played between Associate Members after 1 January 2019. Couana made his T20I debut on 6 November 2019, in the first match of the tournament against hosts Malawi.

In October 2021, Couana was named in Mozambique's T20I squad for their matches in Group B of the 2021 ICC Men's T20 World Cup Africa Qualifier tournament in Rwanda. In Mozambique's second match of the qualifier, against Cameroon, he scored 104 runs and took five wickets. He became the first player for Mozambique to score a century in T20Is, and to take a five-wicket haul in T20Is. He also became the first player to score a century and take five wickets in a single T20I match.

References

External links
 

1996 births
Living people
Mozambican cricketers
Mozambique Twenty20 International cricketers
Place of birth missing (living people)